Gamze Gürdal is  a Turkish European champion Para Taekwondo practitioner competing in the K44 event of -57 kg.

Gürdal obtained a quota for participation at the 2020 Summer Paralympics in Tokyo, Japan. She won the gold medal at the 2022 European Taekwondo Championships in Manchester, United Kingdom.

References

Living people
Paralympic taekwondo practitioners of Turkey
Turkish female taekwondo practitioners
Taekwondo practitioners at the 2020 Summer Paralympics
Year of birth missing (living people)
21st-century Turkish women